Former administrative units of Nepal are administrative divisions during Kingdom of Nepal. In 2008 Nepal was proclaimed a federal republic and old administrative units restricted after adoption of new constitution on 20 September 2015.

Formerly, Nepal was divided into 5 development regions, 14 zones, 75 districts, 58 municipalities and 3157 village development committee.

History
Kingdom of Nepal was formed in 1768, by unification of Nepal.

Before the treaty of Sugauli in 1814–16, the territories under Nepalese control included Darjeeling to the South-east, whole of Sikkim to the east, Nainital to the south-west and the Kumaon Kingdom and Garhwal Kingdom to the west.

After the Sugauli treaty in 1814-16 Nepal came to existence in today's shape. During the time of king Rajendra Bir Bikram Shah and prime minister Bhimsen Thapa, Nepal was divided into 10 districts.

During the time of prime minister Bir Shumsher Jang Bahadur Rana (1885-1901) Nepal was divided into 32 districts and Doti, Palpa and Dhankuta were 3 gaunda (English meaning: Cantonment). Hilly region had 20 districts and Terai had 12 districts.

Even after Bir Shumsher Jang Bahadur Rana to the end of Rana rule in Nepal in 1951 and till the proclamation of new constitution of Kingdom of Nepal in 1962, Nepal remained divided into 32 districts. Each had a headquarters and Bada Haqim (District Administrator) as its head. From 1951 to 1962 many acts and constitutions passed which shows name of 32 districts.

In 1962, the reorganisation of traditional 35 districts into 14 zones and 75 development Districts.

In 1972 (2029 B.S.). The late King Birendra in assistance with renowned scholar late Dr. Hark Gurung brought forth the concept of regional development for the harmonious developments of all parts of the country. Subsequently, he divided Nepal into 4 Development Regions in 1972: Eastern, Central, Western and Far Western. Since the Far Western Development Region became too large in size, it was further divided by creating the Mid-Western Development Region in 1981. Mid-western Development Region was created out of Karnali, Rapti and Bheri zones. It was done with the objective to achieve balanced, effective and rapid development programs in the country.

Development Regions

Prior to September 2015, Nepal was divided into 5 Development regions. They were first-level of administrative divisions.

Zones

There were 14 zones divided into 5 development regions. Each development region had 3 zones. Only the Far-Western Development Region had 2 zones.

Districts

There were 75 districts in Nepal before 2015. They were grouped together to form zones. 2 new districts formed after 2015. District Development Committees (DDCs) were established to carry out all the administrative as well as clerical functions of a district.

List of Districts (Zonewise):

Eastern Development Region

Mechi Zone

Outer Terai
Jhapa District (Chandragadhi)
Hill
Ilam District (Ilam)
Panchthar District (Phidim)
Mountain
Taplejung District (Phungling)

Koshi Zone

Outer Terai
Morang District (Biratnagar)
Sunsari District (Inaruwa)
Hill
Bhojpur District (Bhojpur)
Dhankuta District (Dhankuta)
Terhathum District (Myanglung)
Mountain
Sankhuwasabha District (Khandbari)

Sagarmatha Zone

Outer Terai
Saptari District (Rajbiraj)
Siraha District (Siraha)
Inner Terai
Udayapur District (Gaighat)
Hill
Khotang District (Diktel)
Okhaldhunga District (Okhaldhunga)
Mountain
Solukhumbu District (Salleri)

Central Development Region

Janakpur Zone

Outer Terai
Dhanusa District (Janakpur)
Mahottari District (Jaleswar)
Sarlahi District (Malangwa)
Inner Terai
Sindhuli District (Kamalamai)
Hill
Ramechhap District (Manthali)
Mountain
Dolakha District (Charikot)

Bagmati Zone

Hill
Bhaktapur District (Bhaktapur)
Dhading District (Dhading Besi)
Kathmandu District (Kathmandu)
Kavrepalanchok District (Dhulikhel)
Lalitpur District (Lalitpur)
Nuwakot District (Bidur)
Mountain
Rasuwa District (Dhunche)
Sindhupalchok District (Chautara)

Narayani Zone

Outer Terai
Bara District (Kalaiya)
Parsa District (Birgunj)
Rautahat District (Gaur)
Inner Terai
Chitwan District (Bharatpur)
Makwanpur District (Hetauda)

Western Development Region

Gandaki Zone

Hill
Gorkha District (Gorkha)
Kaski District (Pokhara)
Lamjung District (Besisahar)
Syangja District (Syangja)
Tanahun District (Byas)
Mountain
Manang District (Chame)

Lumbini Zone

Outer Terai
Kapilvastu District (Kapilvastu)
Nawalparasi District (Parasi)
Rupandehi District (Siddharthanagar)
Hill
Arghakhanchi District (Sandhikharka)
Gulmi District (Tamghas)
Palpa District (Tansen)

Daulagiri Zone

Hill
Baglung District (Baglung)
Myagdi District (Beni)
Parbat District (Kusma)
Mountain
Mustang District (Jomsom)

Mid-Western Development Region

Rapti Zone

Inner Terai
Dang District (Ghorahi)
Hill
Pyuthan District (Pyuthan Khalanga)
Rolpa District (Liwang)
Rukum District (Musikot)
Salyan District (Salyan Khalanga)

Karnali Zone

Mountain
Dolpa District (Dunai)
Humla District (Simikot)
Jumla District (Jumla Khalanga)
Kalikot District (Manma)
Mugu District (Gamgadhi)

Bheri Zone

Outer Terai
Banke District (Nepalganj)
Bardiya District (Gulariya)
Inner Terai
Surkhet District (Birendranagar)
Hill
Dailekh District (Narayan)
Jajarkot District (Khalanga)

Far-Western Development Region

Seti Zone

Outer Terai
Kailali District (Dhangadhi)
Hill
Achham District (Mangalsen)
Doti District (Dipayal)
Mountain
Bajhang District (Chainpur)
Bajura District (Martadi)

Mahakali Zone

Outer Terai
Kanchanpur District (Bhim Datta)
Inner Terai and Hill
Dadeldhura District (Dadeldhura)
Hill
Baitadi District (Baitadi)
Mountain
Darchula District (Darchula)

Municipalities

Municipalities are an administrative units to work in urban area. There were only 58 following Municipalities in Nepal before 2014.

Village Development Committees

Formally, Villages were administered by Village development committees in Nepal. They were dissolved before the new constitution in 2015 and formed Gaunpalika.

National Association of Village Development Committees in Nepal (NAVIN) was established in the year 1996 as an umbrella organization to represent and provide support to Nepal's 3915 VDCs (Village Government in Nepal). In a short span of its origin, NAVIN has been able to establish itself, both nationally and internationally, as a reputable representative organization of VDCs and has founded itself as a pioneer partner organization for decentralization and democratization process in Nepal. The Village Development Committee were defunct in March 2017 and replaced with Gaupalika

See also
Development Regions of Nepal
List of zones of Nepal
List of village development committees of Nepal

External links
Digitalhimalaya.com: Collection of Nepalese District maps — from the Digital Himalaya database project.
Myholidaynepal.com: Places of Nepal

References

Subdivisions of Nepal
Former subdivisions of Nepal